Golden Beach is a 700 metre long beach on the south eastern part of the island of Paros, Greece. It takes its name from the fine sand, which has glass elements in it and provides a sparkling effect during sunshine.

Golden Beach has become a popular destination for wind-surfers and kite-surfers from around the world due to the windy conditions inside as well as outside the small bay. The beach has been awarded the blue flag, as have many other Greek beaches. Across the beach lies the small uninhabited island of Drionisi, which can be reached only by boat. During the summer months, many visitors come to Golden Beach, not only to pursue water sports, but also to enjoy the shallow waters and the amazing scenery. There is a bus connection with the main towns of the island.

On the beach, visitors may find surf schools, scuba diving centers, beach bars and restaurants. The region around the beach is considered to be the most fertile of the whole island due to its water resources. A number of hotels are available for those who wish to spend their vacations on this side of the island.

Beaches of Greece
Landforms of Paros (regional unit)
Tourist attractions in the South Aegean
Landforms of the South Aegean